Yuvaraja Sri Sir Kanteerava Narasimharaja Wadiyar  (5 June 1888 – 11 March 1940), was the heir apparent of the princely state of Mysore from 1895 until his death in 1940.

Biography
Narasimharaja Wodeyar was born at the Mysore Palace, the second son of Chamaraja Wadiyar X, 23rd Maharaja of Mysore, by his wife Kempa Nanjammani Vani Vilasa Sannidhana. In 1894, when he was six years of age, his father died. His mother served as Queen Regent of Mysore between 1894 and 1902 during the minority of his elder brother, Nalvadi Krishnaraja Wadiyar. Narasimharaja Wodeyar's only son, Jayachamaraja Wadiyar, was to be the 25th and the last Maharaja of Mysore (1940–1950).

An intelligent student, Narasimharaja Wodeyar had his early education at the private royal school of Mysore (functioning from Lokaranjan Mahal, a.k.a. "summer palace" in Mysore). His education and training was entrusted to Sir Stuart Fraser, Mr. P. Raghavendra Rao and others. He was later sent to Mayo College, Ajmer. After becoming very sick during his stay at Mayo College, he returned to Mysore and pursued his studies and training under Captain Heale. He was granted the personal style of His Highness by the viceroy of India on 1 January 1918.

Narasimharaja Wodeyar was a well travelled man and a very accomplished public speaker. He was an excellent horseman and played polo alongside his brother to bring laurels to the Mysore team. He was a great lover of books and a passionate patron of music, of which he was no mean exponent.

Family
On 17 June 1910 Narasimharaja Wodeyar married Kempu Cheluvaja Ammanni Avaru, the daughter of Dalavay Devaraja Urs, a nobleman of the Mysore court. The couple had three daughters — Vijayalakshmi Ammani Avaru, later Rani Vijaya Devi of Kotda Sangani; Sujayakantha Ammani Avaru, later the Thakurani Sahiba of Sanand and Jayachamunda Ammani Avaru, later H. H. Maharani Sri Jaya Chamunda Ammani Avaru Sahiba, the Maharani of Bharatpur — and son Jayachamaraja Wodeyar, the last ruling Maharaja of Mysore.

Narasimharaja Wodeyar died on the morning of 11 March 1940 at the anchorage in Bombay, then the property of Mysore. His body was cremated at the Mahim Hindu Crematorium in Mahim the same day. His brother also died five months later.

Titles
1888–1911: Yuvaraja Sri Kanthirava Narasimharaja Wodeyar Bahadur, Yuvaraja of Mysore
1911–1915: Yuvaraja Sri Sir Kanthirava Narasimharaja Wodeyar Bahadur, Yuvaraja of Mysore, KCIE
1915–1918: Yuvaraja Sri Sir Kanthirava Narasimharaja Wodeyar Bahadur, Yuvaraja of Mysore, GCIE
1918–1940: His Highness Yuvaraja Sri Sir Kanthirava Narasimharaja Wodeyar Bahadur, Yuvaraja of Mysore, GCIE

Honours
Delhi Durbar Gold Medal-1911
Knight Grand Commander of the Order of the Indian Empire (GCIE)-1915  (KCIE-1911)
King George V Silver Jubilee Medal-1935
King George VI Coronation Medal-1937

Places in honour
Narasimharajapura - A Town in Chikkamagalur district is named after him
Sahakara Bhavan in Mysore for which he laid stone on 22 March 1933 was named after him by K. T. Bhashyam (Then Law and Labour Minister of Mysore State), on 7 October 1951)
Kanteerava Narasimharaja Pura, a locality in Mysore
Kanteerava Narasimharaja Wadiyar Sports Club, Mysore

References

External links
 His Hignhess Sri. Kanteerava Narsimha Raja Wadiyar

Wadiyar, Kanteerava Narasimharaja
Wadiyar, Kanteerava Narasimharaja
Kanteerava Narasimharaja
Knights Grand Commander of the Order of the Indian Empire
Indian knights